The Gran Valira is the largest river in Andorra. It flows through the capital, Andorra la Vella, and exits the country in the south near the Spain–Andorra road border crossing.

The Gran Valira is a tributary to the Segre, which in turn is a tributary to the Ebro. It flows into the Segre in La Seu d'Urgell. Its main tributaries are the Valira d'Orient, the Valira del Nord and the Madriu.

The map service of the Andorran government calls it the Gran Valira. In certain sources, especially those with a Spanish influence such as maps published in Spain, it is sometimes referred to as the Valira because in the territory of Spain there is only one Valira river. In Andorra, however, there are several different Valiras and hence there is a need to distinguish between them.

References

Rivers of Spain
Rivers of Catalonia
Rivers of Andorra
International rivers of Europe